Chechens in Austria are Austrian citizens of Chechen descent and Chechen refugees living in Austria.

Notable Chechens of Austria 

 Mairbek Taisumov — MMA fighter, signed in the UFC
 Mamihan Mukhadiyevich Umarov

References 

Ethnic groups in Austria
Austrian